Pseudohyaleucerea melanthoides is a moth in the subfamily Arctiinae. It was described by Schaus in 1920. It is found in Costa Rica, Guatemala and Honduras.

References

Natural History Museum Lepidoptera generic names catalog

Moths described in 1920
Euchromiina